This is a list of British television related events from 1951.

Events

January – June
No events.

July
16 July – What's My Line? debuts on the BBC Television Service. It will be one of the top-rated programmes for the rest of the decade and make a star of its host, Eamonn Andrews, who takes over from Gilbert Harding from the second episode.

August – September
No events.

October
12 October – The Holme Moss transmitter is opened in Northern England, making the BBC Television Service available to the region for the first time.

November – December
No events.

Debuts
6 February – The Railway Children (1951)
20 May – The Black Arrow (1951)
17 June – Five Children and It (1951)
16 July – What's My Line? (1951–1963, 1973-1974, 1984-1990)
29 July – The Final Test (1951)
12 August – Albert (1951)
2 September – Treasure on Pelican (1951)
25 September – Puck of Pook's Hill (1951)
20 October 
Sherlock Holmes (1951)
Stranger from Space (1951-1952)
6 November – Sara Crewe (1951)
Unknown 
The Charlie Chester Show (1951, 1955)
The Inch Man (1951-1952)

Continuing television shows

1920s
BBC Wimbledon (1927–1939, 1946–2019, 2021–2024)

1930s
Picture Page (1936–1939, 1946–1952)
For the Children (1937–1939, 1946–1952)
 The Boat Race (1938–1939, 1946–2019)
BBC Cricket (1939, 1946–1999, 2020–2024)

1940s
Kaleidoscope (1946–1953)
Muffin the Mule (1946–1955, 2005–2006)
Café Continental (1947–1953)
Television Newsreel (1948–1954)
Come Dancing (1949–1998)
How Do You View? (1949–1953)

1950s
Andy Pandy (1950–1970, 2002–2005)

Ending this year
23 January – Little Women (1950–1951)
24 November – Sherlock Holmes (1951)

Births
 7 January – Helen Worth, born Cathryn Helen Wigglesworth, actress
 6 February – Kevin Whately, actor
 15 February – Jane Seymour, born Joyce Frankenberg, actress
 18 March – Paul Barber, actor
 13 April – Peter Davison, actor
 20 April – Louise Jameson, actress
 11 May – Kay Mellor, born Kay Daniel, scriptwriter and actress (died 2022)
 13 May – Selina Scott, journalist, newsreader and television presenter
 4 June – David Yip, actor
 28 June – Lalla Ward, actress
 4 September – David Renwick, scriptwriter
 10 September – Sally Grace, satirist, actress and voice actress
 30 September – John Lloyd, producer
 6 November – Nigel Havers, actor
 15 November – Billy McColl, actor (died 2014)
 24 November – Margaret Mountford, lawyer, businesswoman and television personality
 20 December – Peter May, novelist and television dramatist

See also
 1951 in British music
 1951 in British radio
 1951 in the United Kingdom
 List of British films of 1951

References